The  Folkestone, Hythe and Sandgate Tramways  operated a tramway service in Hythe, Kent between 1891 and 1921.

History
The tramway was associated with the efforts to develop the properties of the Seabrook Estate Company and the Seabrook Hotel Company, both promotions of Sir Edward Watkin of the South Eastern Railway.

The Folkestone, Sangate and Hythe Tramways Act of 1884 authorised the construction of the line, and the South Eastern Railway Act of 12 July 1887 authorised the railway to guarantee the interest on the capital.

The first section to open was from Hythe railway station to Seabrook, Kent, to facilitate the construction of the Princes Road Parade and the sea wall designed by Sir John Goode for the Seabrook Estate Company.

Services started on 18 May 1891 from Sandgate School to the Seabrook Hotel. It was extended to the Red Lion Hotel, Hythe on 6 June 1892. 

There were five tramcars and 25 horses. The service was half-hourly and the fare was 3d.

A storm between 10 and 14 February 1899 damaged the tramway on Sandgate seafront. A  stretch of sea wall was breached opposite Wellington terrace.

An act of parliament on 4 August 1906 authorised the Folkestone, Hythe and Sandgate Tramways Company to take over the system from the South Eastern Railway.

Closure

During the First World War the military commandeered the horses and services were suspended on 7 August 1914.  It reopened after the war in the summer only, but services finally ended in 1921.

References

Tram transport in England
Rail transport in Kent